Lakeshore was a provincial electoral district that elected members to the Legislative Assembly of Ontario. It was roughly located in southern Etobicoke It existed from 1963 to 1987 when it was abolished into Etobicoke—Lakeshore.

Members of Provincial Parliament

Electoral results

References

Notes

Citations

Former provincial electoral districts of Ontario
Provincial electoral districts of Toronto